KNUT (101.1 FM), broadcasting as Star 101 FM, is a radio station broadcasting as a Rhythmic top 40 format, and it is now located in Tamuning, Guam area. The station is currently owned by Choice Broadcasting Company.

History

KBLB and KCNM-FM (1999–2010)
The station was launched in 1999 as KBLB in Saipan, Northern Mariana Islands and operated under that name through most of the year. The FM station was assigned the KCNM-FM call letters by the Federal Communications Commission on October 7, 1999, and changed them to the current KNUT on July 14, 2010, for the Island music.

Fun 101 FM (2012–2016)
As of February 15, 2012, KNUT was transfer from Saipan, Northern Mariana Islands to Tamuning, Guam and became as "Fun 101 FM" for the Original Pilipino Music, Top 40, and K-pop for the Filipino station.

Star 101
On October 3, 2016, at around 3 AM, KNUT flipped to Top 40/CHR as "Star 101," giving Guam its fourth Top 40.

In September 2019, the station switch to its current Rhythmic CHR format

DJs

Current 
 JED
 Jon Palau
 Ryan the Mixologist
 Shawnzy B.

Former 
 Kristine "Kai" Young
 Donna de Jesus (moved to KIJI)
 Aaron Tamayo
 Blake Watson
 The Real Joe Cruz

References

External links

 

NUT
NUT
Rhythmic contemporary radio stations in the United States
1999 establishments in the Northern Mariana Islands
Radio stations established in 1999
Tamuning, Guam